{{DISPLAYTITLE:C22H14}}
The molecular formula C22H14 (molar mass: 278.36 g/mol) may refer to:

 Dibenz[a,h]anthracene
 Dibenz[a,j]anthracene
 Pentacene
 
 Picene

Molecular formulas